Podolets is a rural locality (a village) in Ugolskoye Rural Settlement, Sheksninsky District, Vologda Oblast, Russia. The population was 17 as of 2002.

Geography 
Podolets is located 11 km southeast of Sheksna (the district's administrative centre) by road. Rylovo is the nearest rural locality.

References 

Rural localities in Sheksninsky District